Nick Derbyshire may refer to:

 Nick Derbyshire (cricketer) (born 1970), English cricketer
 Nick Derbyshire (architect) (died 2016), chief architect for British Rail